Gillisia is a Gram-negative and strictly aerobic genus of bacteria from the family of Flavobacteriaceae. Gillisia is named after the Belgian bacteriologist Monique Gillis.

References

Flavobacteria
Bacteria genera
Taxa described in 2004